The Venna River rises in Mahabaleshwar, and is a tributary of the Krishna River in Satara district of western Maharashtra, India. It rises near Mahableshwar, a famous hill station in the Western Ghats. 
The river meets the Krishna River and this confluence takes place at Sangam Mahuli which is located in eastern part of Satara city. The River Krishna is one of the three largest rivers in southern India.

See also 

Other four rivers originating from Mahabaleshwar (Panchganga):

 Gayatri River
 Koyna River
 Krishna River
 Savitri River

References

Rivers of Maharashtra
Tributaries of the Krishna River
Rivers of India